Creston Aerodrome  is located  south southeast of Creston, British Columbia, Canada. The airport is more commonly known now as the Creston Valley Regional Airport or its former name of the Art Sutcliffe Field.

History
In 1919, Lieutenant Ernest O. Hall made an emergency landing on an uneven field near the Canyon City Lumber mill. After refilling the tanks with contaminated fuel, the plane crashed on takeoff, damaging a car and wrecking the aircraft.

An airstrip has existed at least since the 1930s.

In late 1978, the community received a $100,000 grant toward an airport, enabling the development of one of the finest airstrips in the region.

In 2011, several all-season, all-weather hangars were built primarily for the active flying club, and a new emergency services building was erected for the medivac.

External links
Page about this airport on COPA's Places to Fly airport directory

References

Registered aerodromes in British Columbia
West Kootenay